Salmo nigripinnis, also known as the sonaghen, is a species of fish within the subfamily Salmoninae.

Description 
Salmo nigripinnis can range in body colour from light brown to silver, with large black spots. Fins of the species are dark brown or black, with elongated pectoral fins.

Distribution and Habitat 
Salmo nigripinnis is endemic to Lough Melvin. Lough Melvin's waters cross the Northwest Border of Ireland into Northern Ireland, meaning that this species lake habitat is in both Ireland and the United Kingdom.

S. nigripinnis live in open areas of the lake in deep water. They use small inflowing rivers to spawn.

References 

Fish described in 1866
Freshwater fish of Ireland
nigripinnis